Bernardino Fasolo (Pavia, 1489-1526/1527) was an Italian painter.

Biography
He was the son of Lorenzo Fasolo, was living in the 16th century at Pavia. He is known to have been a member of the council of the Guild in Genoa in 1520. The following pictures are by him:

A Holy Family, Berlin Gallery.
Portrait of a Venetian Lady, Dresden Gallery.
Virgin and Child (1518) Santuario del Monte, Genoa.

References 

Attribution:
 

Year of birth unknown
1520s deaths
16th-century Italian painters
Italian male painters
Artists from Pavia
Painters from Genoa
1489 births